Jim, Jimmy or James Pearce may refer to:

Politicians
James Pearce (1805–1862), American senator from Maryland
James Pearce (South Australian politician) (1825–1904), House of Assembly and Legislative Council member
Jim Pearce (politician) (born 1948), Australian Labor member of Queensland Legislative Assembly

Sportsmen
James Pearce (American football) (before 1903–after 1922), All-Southern college tackle
Jim Pearce (footballer) (before 1918–after 1947), Welsh centre-half
Jim Pearce (baseball) (1925–2005), American pitcher
Jimmy Pearce (born 1947), English footballer

Others
James Alfred Pearce (judge) (1840–1920), American jurist on Maryland Court of Appeals
James Pearce (journalist), British presenter for BBC Sport since 2003

See also
James Pierce (disambiguation)
James Peirce (c.1674–1726), English dissenting minister